Marmaduke is a 2010 American live-action/computer-animated comedy film and an adaptation of Brad Anderson's comic strip of the same name. The film centers on a rural Kansas family and their pets; a Great Dane named Marmaduke (voiced by Owen Wilson), and his best friend, a Balinese cat named Carlos (voiced by George Lopez); as the family relocates to Orange County, California and has to face the challenges of starting a new life. The film was released on June 4, 2010 and received largely negative reviews from critics.

Plot
Marmaduke is a Great Dane, living in rural Kansas with his best friend Carlos, a Balinese. Their owner Phil Winslow works as a marketing director for a dog food company. Phil is very strict with Marmaduke. He and his wife Debbie have three children: Brian, Barbara and Sarah.

One day, Carlos tells Marmaduke that he overheard Phil saying that they were being transferred to Orange County. In their new location, Phil must meet his new boss at the dog park. The boss has a beautiful collie called Jezebel and Marmaduke takes a shine to her. Marmaduke also meets an Australian Shepherd named Mazie who introduces him to her crew: a nervous Chinese Crested called Giuseppe, and a knowledgeable Dachshund named Raisin. They indicate the snobbish group in the park. This includes Bosco, a tough and callous Beauceron who had two Miniature Pinscher minions named Thunder and Lightning. Bosco tells Marmaduke to stay away from Jezebel who is his girlfriend. Later that night, Marmaduke and the mutts get together at night and crash Bosco's pedigrees-only party, only to be scared away. Marmaduke asks Mazie to help him get a girl, whom she presumes is herself but is Jezebel.

Marmaduke has Carlos pretend to be lost in the dog park, and the two stage a fight in front of all the dogs to boost Marmaduke's popularity. Marmaduke enters a dog surfing contest put together as a promotional stunt by Phil to sway Petco and beats Bosco, who is the reigning dog-surfing champion. They get into a fight, appalling the Petco executives in the process. As a result, Phil hires a dog trainer named Anton to help him control Marmaduke, albeit with little success.

Marmaduke takes Jezebel on Mazie's dream date, which the latter watches from afar. While the Winslow family are on Don's boat, Marmaduke throws a party; most residents of the dog park attend, save for Mazie, Giuseppe and Raisin. Bosco crashes the party after discovering that Carlos lives with Marmaduke and the Winslows. He exposes Marmaduke, who loses his friends. When the Winslows return and Phil discovers the house in a wreck, he locks Marmaduke outside. Marmaduke runs away and leaves Mazie a toy she had given him earlier. Mazie goes to Marmaduke's house, and Carlos tells her that he left the house. As she looks for him, Marmaduke meets Chupadogra, a wise, elderly English Mastiff who is feared for presumably eating his owner. In reality, he ran away to lead a pack, but they abandoned him. He has spent the time alone in the woods with nothing but a blanket and his old water bowl, which reads "Buster". Buster tells Marmaduke to return to his family while he still has one and distracts a dog catcher. Marmaduke leaves but gets lost.

The next morning, the family discover that Marmaduke is missing and begin searching for him. Mazie and the family find him at the same time on the streets, but Mazie falls into the subterranean rainwater conduit after the street below her collapses. Marmaduke jumps in after her and Phil tries to retrieve him, as well as the fire department. The fireman saves Mazie but loses Marmaduke in the raging water. By this time, Phil has been fired for missing the meeting for the last chance with Petco. He then runs to the aqueduct that the conduits lead to and finds Marmaduke in the raging waters. He begs Marmaduke to let go of the branch he's holding onto and let the waters carry him to Phil. He reluctantly does, and is saved. Several kids record it on video and put it on YouTube. Since it generates almost 700,000 hits, Phil is rehired. Phil then talks about moving back to Kansas, but the entire family wants to stay in California. Marmaduke later confronts the pedigrees, saying that differences shouldn't matter, that they're all dogs and should have an equal share of the park. Everyone agrees and turn on Bosco, who leaves, after revealing his fear of bees, which Marmaduke is also afraid of. Meanwhile, the YouTube video also wins the company the Petco deal. Phil and Don begin thinking of new commercials when they ask each other about if the dogs could talk to each other, or even dance.

The finale then shows Marmaduke, Carlos, Jezebel, Mazie, Giuseppe, Raisin, Thunder, Lightning, and Buster, among others, dancing and singing "What I Like About You", which turns out to be the commercial. In the end, Marmaduke and Mazie are dating, Marmaduke and Jezebel are friends and all is well. Marmaduke then passes gas in the bed as he winks at the camera.

Cast

Humans
 Lee Pace as Phil Winslow
 Judy Greer as Debbie Winslow
 William H. Macy as Don Twombly
 Raugi Yu as Drama Trainer
 Finley Jacobsen as Brian Winslow
 Caroline Sunshine as Barbara Winslow
 Mandy Haines and Milana Haines as Sarah Winslow
 Frank Topol as Bosco's Owner

Dogs and cats
 Owen Wilson as Marmaduke, a Great Dane.
 George Lopez as Carlos, a Balinese cat.
 Emma Stone as Mazie, an energetic Australian Shepherd.
 Fergie as Jezebel, a Rough Collie.
 Christopher Mintz-Plasse as Giuseppe, a stylized Chinese Crested Dog.
 Steve Coogan as Raisin, a Dachshund.
 Kiefer Sutherland as Bosco, a Beauceron.
 Damon Wayans, Jr. as Thunder, a Miniature Pinscher.
 Marlon Wayans as Lightning, Thunder's twin brother.
 Sam Elliott as Chupadogra, an elderly English Mastiff.

Release
Marmaduke was released on June 4, 2010, by 20th Century Fox to 3,213 theaters in the US. It was released on DVD and Blu-ray on August 31, 2010.

Reception

Box office 
The film earned $3.4 million on opening day, landing in sixth place behind Sex and the City 2, Prince of Persia: The Sands of Time, Killers, Get Him to the Greek, and Shrek Forever After respectively. The film remained in sixth place over the weekend, with $11.6 million earned for a $3,608 average from 3,213 theaters. In its second weekend, it had a 48% decline to just over $6 million and descending to seventh place. The film closed on September 16, 2010, after grossing $33.6 million in the US and an additional $50.1 million overseas for a worldwide total of $83.8 million.

Critical response
On the review aggregator website Rotten Tomatoes, 9% of 103 reviews are positive, with an average rating of 3.30/10. The website's critical consensus reads, "Dull and unfunny, Marmaduke offers family filmgoers little more than another round of talking animals and scatological humor." On Metacritic, the film has a score of 30 out of 100 based on 22 critics, indicating "generally unfavorable reviews". Audiences polled by CinemaScore gave the film an average grade of "B+" on an A+ to F scale.

Roger Ebert of the Chicago Sun-Times gave the film two out of four stars, and wrote in his review, "The moment I saw Marmaduke's big drooling lips moving, I knew I was in trouble." The Radio Times was quite positive, saying "it's all a tad contrived, but young and old alike will get something from it—even if the lip movements take a bit of getting used to."

Accolades 
Marmaduke was nominated at the Teen Choice Awards for Choice Movie: Animated. George Lopez was nominated for a Razzie Award for Worst Supporting Actor for his roles in Marmaduke, among others.

Animated reboot 

It was announced on the Andrews McMeel website that an animated film adaptation of Marmaduke was planned to be released sometime in 2022. The film features Pete Davidson as Marmaduke, J.K. Simmons as Zeus, and David Koechner as Phil Winslow. However, instead of releasing by 20th Century Fox under the 20th Century Fox Animation label, the animation was provided by One Cool Animation and the film was released on Netflix on May 6, 2022 and in theatres internationally on May 27, 2022 alongside Top Gun: Maverick and The Bob's Burgers Movie. The film also received negative reviews similar to the 2010 film.

References

External links

 
 
 
 
 

2010 films
2010 comedy films
2010s English-language films
American comedy films
Films about animals
Films about cats
Films about dogs
Films set in Kansas
Films set in Orange County, California
Films based on comic strips
Live-action films based on comics
20th Century Fox films
Davis Entertainment films
Dune Entertainment films
Regency Enterprises films
Films directed by Tom Dey
Films produced by John Davis
Films scored by Christopher Lennertz
Marmaduke
2010s American films